Yousef Zayed (born 2 September 1979) is a Kuwaiti footballer. He competed in the men's tournament at the 2000 Summer Olympics.

References

External links
 

1979 births
Living people
Kuwaiti footballers
Kuwait international footballers
Al-Fahaheel FC players
Al Salmiya SC players
Asian Games competitors for Kuwait
Association football defenders
Footballers at the 2000 Summer Olympics
Footballers at the 2002 Asian Games
Kuwait SC players
Olympic footballers of Kuwait
Place of birth missing (living people)
Kuwait Premier League players